Randall Lee Tate (October 23, 1952 – March 25, 2021) was an American professional baseball pitcher who played for the New York Mets in their 1975 season.

Career
His record that year was 5 wins and 13 losses with an earned run average of 4.45. While Tate is noted for never having achieved a Major League hit despite having 41 at bats, he is best known for nearly pitching a no-hitter on August 4, 1975 at Shea Stadium against the Montreal Expos. Despite not allowing a hit through seven and one third innings, Tate ended up losing the game—which seems to have been the final straw for Mets management regarding the tenure of manager Yogi Berra, who was fired the next day.

After spending the entire 1975 season in the Mets starting pitching rotation, Tate was sent to the Mets' class AAA minor league affiliate at Tidewater for the 1976 season. He pitched poorly and never made another major league appearance. After 1976, Tate was traded to the Pittsburgh Pirates and pitched for their Triple A affiliate. He tore his rotator cuff and was forced out of the league.

Death
Tate died from complications of COVID-19 in Muscle Shoals, Alabama, on March 25, 2021, during the COVID-19 pandemic in Alabama. He was 68.

References

External links

1952 births
2021 deaths
Major League Baseball pitchers
Pompano Beach Mets players
New York Mets players
Calhoun Warhawks baseball players
Baseball players from Alabama
Sportspeople from Florence, Alabama
Deaths from the COVID-19 pandemic in Alabama
Anderson Mets players
Columbus Clippers players
Lynchburg Mets players
Marion Mets players
Shreveport Captains players
Tidewater Tides players